Swinhoe's striped squirrel (Tamiops swinhoei) is a small species of rodent in the family Sciuridae. This species is found mostly in China and Southeast Asia. Their diet consists of mostly seeds, fruits, nuts and ginger nectar. Like most squirrels they live in forest areas with mountains, usually in groups. They have litters that average in size of 3.25 offspring.

Physical features 
They are small bodied with stripes running from their nose to their neck and a second set that run the length of their body to their tail. The stripes range in color from yellow to brown cinnamon. Small tufts of white fur can be seen on the tips of their ears. They have dense fur to accommodate for the high elevation where they live. Females have a longer tail than males.

Reproduction 
Swinhoe's striped squirrels usually breed once every six months. On average they can have 3-6 offspring in a litter.

Diet 
Swinhoe's striped squirrel are herbivores. They eat mostly nuts, seeds, fruits, and ginger nectar. They collect their food and store it for later dates when food is scarce.

Ecosystem contributions 
Consuming seeds and nuts is helpful to disperse seeds and nuts in order for more to grow. This species of squirrel also helps humans survive by being a source of food.

Distribution and habitat 
Swinhoe's striped squirrel is found mostly in Southeast Asia, China, Vietnam, Myanmar, Hainan Island, and possibly Laos. They live in tropical rain forest, where there are many mountains, in mostly couples and groups.

References

Tamiops
Mammals described in 1874
Rodents of Myanmar
Rodents of China
Rodents of Vietnam
Fauna of Tibet
Taxonomy articles created by Polbot